Trumpchi is an automotive marque owned by the Chinese automaker GAC Group. It was launched in December 2010.

History

GAC began the construction of facilities to produce vehicles for a new own-brand automotive marque in 2008. The first Trumpchi model to go into production, the Trumpchi GA5 sedan, a four-door mid-size saloon car model based on the platform of the Alfa Romeo 166, went into mass production in September 2010. The first 500 Trumpchi sedans produced were delivered to the organizing committee of the 2010 Asian Games in October 2010.

The Trumpchi Sedan was formally unveiled to the public at Auto Guangzhou in December 2010, and public sales of the vehicles began in the same month. The Trumpchi GS5, a sport utility vehicle based on the same platform as the Trumpchi Sedan, was launched in March 2012.

The production version of the Trumpchi GA3 compact sedan was unveiled at the Shanghai Auto Show in April 2013.

Models

Current models

Cars
 Empow (2021–present), a compact sports sedan
 GA4 (2018–present), a compact sedan replacing the GA5
 GA6 (2014–present), a mid-size sedan
 GA8 (2015–present), a full-size sedan

Minivans/MPVs
 M6/M6 Pro (2018–present), a compact MPV
 GM8/M8 (2017–present), a minivan

Crossovers/SUVs
 GS3 (2017—present), a subcompact crossover
 GE3 (2017–present), an electric version of the GS3
 GS4 (2015–present), a compact crossover
 GS4 PHEV (2017–present), a plug-in hybrid version of the GS4
 GS4 Coupe (2019–present), a compact fastback-styled crossover based on the GS4
 GS5/GS4S (2011–present), a compact crossover
 Emkoo (2023–present), a compact-size SUV
 GS7/GS8S (2017–present), a mid-size SUV
 GS8 (2016–present), a full-size SUV

Discontinued models

Cars
 GA3 (2013–2014), a subcompact sedan succeeded by the GA3S
 GA3S (2014–2019), a subcompact sedan replacing the GA3
 GA3S PHEV (2016–2019), a plug-in hybrid version of the GA3S
 GA5 (2010–2018), a compact sedan succeeded by the GA4
 GA5 PHEV (2014–2018), plug-in hybrid version of the GA5

SUVs
 GS4 EV (2017–2019), an electric version of the GS4
 GS5S (2014–2018), a compact SUV, replacing then later succeed by the GA5

Concept vehicles
 2ALL (2018), a city car
 2U (2018), a city car
 2US (2018), a city car
 E-Jet (2014), a subcompact sedan
 E-Linker (2011), a subcompact hatchback
 EnLight (2016), a sports car
 Enpulse (2020), a sports car
 Time (2021) a full-size sedan
 EnSpirit (2017), a compact SUV
 Entranze (2019), a compact MPV
 Enverge (2018), a compact SUV
 GA6 concept (2014), a mid-size sedan
 i-Lounge (2015), a minivan
 iSPACE (2017), a subcompact MPV
 Space Concept (2022), a Minivan
 Moca (2020), a subcompact car
 VIP Lounge (2009), a compact sedan
 WitStar (2015), a compact SUV
 X-Power (2009), a compact SUV

Product gallery

Sales
In 2011, 17,000 Trumpchi vehicles were sold in China, the only market in which they were then available. A total of around 32,000 Trumpchi vehicles were sold in 2012.

In September 2012, GAC announced that exports of Trumpchi cars to markets including Eastern Europe, the Middle East, South America and Southeast Asia would begin in 2013.

On 28 December 2021, GAC launched fully-imported CBU model Trumpchi GS3 Power in Malaysia through WTC Automotive to competes against Proton X50, Perodua Ativa and Honda HR-V in Malaysia market.

References

External links
 
 (Global)

GAC Group divisions and subsidiaries
Vehicle manufacturing companies established in 2010
Electric vehicle manufacturers of China
Cars of China
Chinese brands
Luxury motor vehicle manufacturers